This is a list of posthumous Academy Award winners and nominees.  The Academy of Motion Picture Arts and Sciences annually presents Academy Awards in both competitive and honorary categories.  This list includes posthumous winners and nominees of the Academy's competitive awards, as well as posthumous winners of its honorary awards.

Competitive awards

Honorary awards

Excluded: retrospective awards
The list does not include people who were retrospectively honoured with an Academy Award and were dead at the time the Academy made the decision to make the retrospective award.  For example: in 1993, seventeen years after his death, Dalton Trumbo was retrospectively awarded the 1953 Oscar for Academy Award for Best Story for Roman Holiday.  It had been previously awarded to Ian McLellan Hunter.  However, Hunter was merely a front for Trumbo, because Trumbo was blacklisted at the time and it was not possible for his name to appear in either the film's credits or the Academy Award nomination (hence, it was not generally known that he was the real screenwriter).  Trumbo did not die until 1976, and under normal circumstances he would have received this award in person in 1953; hence the Academy does not consider this a posthumous award but a correction of the record.

Similarly, the Oscar for Best Screenplay (Adaptation) for The Bridge on the River Kwai was originally awarded to Pierre Boulle, but only in 1984 corrected to honor the actual screenwriters, Carl Foreman and Michael Wilson, who were on the Hollywood blacklist at the time and could only work on the film in secret.  By the time this correction was made, both Foreman and Wilson had died, but the award does not qualify for an entry in the above list.

Notes

External links
 Oscars.org (official website for the Academy of Motion Picture Arts and Sciences)
 The Academy Awards Database (official database of Academy Award winners and nominees)
 Academy Awards, USA (Academy Awards information at the Internet Movie Database)
 Filmsite.org (comprehensive Academy Awards history)

Lists of Academy Award winners
Academy Award